A recording format  is a format for encoding data for storage on a storage medium. The format can be container information such as sectors on a disk, or user/audience information (content) such as analog stereo audio.  Multiple levels of encoding may be achieved in one format. For example, a text encoded page may contain HTML and XML encoding, combined in a plain text file format, using either EBCDIC or ASCII character encoding, on a UDF digitally formatted disk.  

In electronic media, the primary format is the encoding that requires hardware to interpret (decode) data; while secondary encoding is interpreted by secondary signal processing methods, usually computer software.

Recording container formats
A container format is a system for dividing physical storage space or virtual space for data. Data space can be divided evenly by a system of measurement, or divided unevenly with meta data. A grid may divide physical or virtual space with physical or virtual (dividers) borders, evenly or unevenly.  Just as a physical container (such as a file cabinet) is divided by physical borders (such as drawers and file folders), data space is divided by virtual borders. Meta data such as a unit of measurement, address, or meta tags act as virtual borders in a container format. A template may be considered an abstract format for containing a solution as well as the content itself. 

 Systems of measurement
Metric system
 Geographic coordinate system
Page grid
 Film formats
 Audio data format
 Video tape format
 Disk format
 File format
 Meta data
 Text formatting
 Template
 Data structure

Raw content formats

A raw content format is a system of converting data to displayable information.  Raw content formats may either be recorded in secondary signal processing methods such as a software container format (e.g. digital audio, digital video) or recorded in the primary format. A primary raw content format may be directly observable (e.g. image, sound, motion, smell, sensation) or physical data which only requires hardware to display it, such as a phonographic needle and diaphragm or a projector lamp and magnifying glass.

Communication
Information science
Data management
Film and video technology
Computer storage media
Recording